Shokranlu may refer to:
 Shokranlu, Howmeh, a village in Shirvan County, North Khorasan Province, Iran
 Shokranlu, Sivkanlu, a village in Shirvan County, North Khroasan Province, Iran